The Signal Hill Battery was constructed in 1892–3 at Watsons Bay and is adjacent to the Signal Hill Lighthouse on Old South Head Road.

History and description

The Battery was one of a set of three coastal defence fortifications in Sydney, New South Wales, Australia, the other two being the Ben Buckler Gun Battery at Bondi, and the Shark Point Battery, Clovelly. Each battery consisted of a gun pit that incorporated a BL 9.2-inch (234 mm) Mk VI breech-loading 'counter bombardment' British Armstrong 'disappearing' gun. The various Australian colonial governments bought nine such guns and an extra barrel before Federation.  The Signal Hill gun bore Serial Number 7318 and its barrel survives and is on public display at North Fort, North Head, at the Northern end of Australia's Memorial Walk.

These fortifications were the last link in Sydney's outer defence perimeter, which was intended to defend Sydney from bombardment by an enemy vessel standing off the coast. The fortifications built in the 1890s around Sydney's eastern suburbs were the culmination of some twenty years of construction of harbour defence installations that reflected the changing policy of the time to meet new technologies, threats and styles of warfare.

The 9.2-inch (234 mm) breech loading gun was fired for the last time in 1933. It was removed and replaced in 1937 by two 6-inch (152 mm) Mk XI guns placed in each of two outer gun emplacements; these guns were removed after WWII. The fortification also has an underground complex that runs beneath Old South Head Road. It contains a maze of rooms and corridors including a mess room, elevator shaft and gunpowder magazines. The entrance from the street has been tack welded and sealed.

A memorial was placed there in November 1992 by the Royal Australian Signal Corps Association on behalf of its members. Two plaques were also placed on 30 March 1993, putting the reserve in proper historical perspective.

See also

 Military history of Australia

References

Batteries in Australia
Buildings and structures in Sydney
Bunkers in Oceania
Forts in New South Wales
History of Sydney
Vaucluse, New South Wales